On 2 September 1995, a Royal Air Force Hawker Siddeley Nimrod aircraft crashed into Lake Ontario during an air display, killing all seven crew members on board. This was the second loss of an RAF Nimrod in four months, following the ditching of a Nimrod R1 in May.

Aircraft
The aircraft involved was XV239, a Nimrod MR.2 maritime patrol aircraft from RAF Kinloss. Operated by No. 120 Squadron, the aircraft was originally delivered to the RAF as an MR.1 in 1971, before being one of 35 Nimrod airframes selected for upgrade to MR.2 standard in the mid 1970s.

Background
On 23 August 1995, the aircraft and its crew had departed RAF Kinloss for Canada, where it was scheduled to take part in two separate air shows. On the 26 and 27 August, the aircraft had been displayed at the Shearwater International Air Show at CFB Shearwater in Nova Scotia. Following this, it transited to Toronto Pearson International Airport from where it would be based for display at the Canadian International Air Show (CIAS). The manoeuvres planned had been used to display the Nimrod for much of the previous twenty years, with the four and a half minute routine described as "relatively straightforward". The day prior to the CIAS display, the aircraft's captain, Flight Lieutenant Dom Gilbert, gave an interview in which he stated that the plan was to approach the limits of the aircraft's performance.

Crash details
On 2 September, the aircraft left Pearson Airport on time for its planned display slot. The weather was classed as excellent, with a slight on-shore wind (the display was to take place offshore over Lake Ontario). Having completed safety checks, the aircraft was taken on the standard display sequence for the Nimrod, two circuits of the display line (the area where the viewing crowd was located) and two "dumb-bell" turns; the dumb-bell manoeuvre encompassed a turn away from the display line and climb to approximately 1,000 ft, followed by a turn in the opposite direction and descent back onto the display line. The circuits and first dumb-bell manouvre were successfully completed, followed by a slow fly-past with the undercarriage lowered. The aircraft then turned to starboard to begin the second dumb-bell turn - the undercarriage raised and the flaps set to allow the aircraft to climb at an attitude of 24°. As it reached the top of the climb, the airspeed fell to 122 knots as a result of the engines being powered back, before the aircraft banked and pointed downwards. Although the airspeed increased slightly, it was well below the recommended 150 knots for that part of the display, while the g-force load went to 1.6g. The low speed and g-loading led to a stall which saw the aircraft's nose drop to 18° below the horizon and it bank 85° to port. Despite full starboard aileron and full power being applied, the aircraft was too low by this point to recover and it hit the water. The impact caused the airframe to break up, with the seven crew on-board killed instantly.

Recovery
The recovery effort was immediately set in motion; divers initially located the wreckage, which had broken into four sections, but were unable to locate the crew. To help with the search, a boat from the Toronto Police Service made its way to the crash site and dropped a remotely operated underwater vehicle containing sonar and video cameras. This was able to display images of the wreckage clearly to allow the recovery team to recover the bodies of the crew and debris from the aircraft.

Investigation
A significant amount of data was available, given the public nature of the accident, and the RAF inquiry was able to determine that all of the aircraft's systems had been functioning normally, making it possible to rule out any mechanical or structural failure of the Nimrod as a potential cause. This resulted in the inquiry focusing on the actions of the crew, and in particular the aircraft's captain. It was determined that, at a previous display, he had made an error following the second dumb-bell turn that led to his crossing over the display line; this had not been reported as it should have been, which would have allowed analysis of the display manoeuvres before a scheduled practice run. Instead, on deploying to Canada, the captain amended the manoeuvre by tightening his turn to avoid crossing over the crowd through reducing engine power. This removed the safety margins for the aircraft in performing the display manoeuvres (primarily the dumb-bell) as it took it below the recommended speed and led to it stalling.

The inquiry identified a number of deficiencies in the training regime for Nimrod display that may have contributed to the accident. Primarily, it suggested that the lack of a structured training programme, with theory and simulation as well as practice flights, combined with a lack of supervision in the air, led the captain to try out techniques outside the recommended performance envelope of both the Nimrod and the display.

Aftermath
The recommendations of the RAF inquiry as regards the display of the Nimrod saw a change in the selection of display crews - up to this point, several Nimrod captains and crews per display season were selected. Following the inquiry, it was decided that a single crew, made up of instructors, would be specially selected from the Nimrod Operational Conversion Unit, rather than from operational squadrons.

See also
1995 Royal Air Force Nimrod R1 ditching
2006 Royal Air Force Nimrod crash

References

Aviation accidents and incidents in 1995
1995 in Canada
Aviation accidents and incidents in Canada
History of the Royal Air Force
Accidents and incidents involving Royal Air Force aircraft
Royal Air Force